Army of the Shenandoah refers to two armies in the American Civil War:

 Confederate Army of the Shenandoah
 Union Army of the Shenandoah

See also 
Shenandoah (disambiguation)